The Bootham Hoard (also known as the Bootham School Hoard) is a hoard of coins found in a bronze vessel at Bootham School in York in 1953.

Discovery
The hoard was discovered by workmen digging in the courtyard of Bootham School on 29 September 1953. They reported the find to George Willmot (Keeper of the Yorkshire Museum). An inquest in October declared the find to be a Treasure trove. The Yorkshire Museum purchased the hoard, with the exception of eight coins which were acquired by the British Museum.

Contents
The hoard contained 908 coins. 839 were English silver pennies from the period AD 1251–1326, 16 were Irish coins, 40 Scottish, and 12 Continental.

References

1953 in England
Archaeological sites in Yorkshire
Metal detecting finds in England
History of North Yorkshire
Collections of the Yorkshire Museum
Treasure troves in England
Archaeological sites in North Yorkshire
1953 archaeological discoveries
Coin hoards
Medieval European objects in the British Museum
Bootham